Boundary Dam Reservoir is a man-made lake in the south-east corner of the province of Saskatchewan, Canada. It is in census division 1, in the RM of Estevan. The closest city is Estevan, which is 5.5 kilometres downstream. There are no towns or villages along the lake's shore but there are two subdivisions and a regional park. The subdivisions, which are in the RM of Estevan, are called Sunset Bay and Lakewood. The primary inflow and outflow for the reservoir is Long Creek. There is a 10-kilometre long diversion channel that goes to McDonald Lake that can take excess water in either direction.

Boundary Dam
The Boundary Dam was built in 1957 on Long Creek so that a reservoir could supply water to the Boundary Dam Power Station and the city of Estevan. The top of the dam is 563.88 metres above sea level. The full supply level is at 560 metres, which gives the reservoir 61,480 dam when full. The maximum drawdown is 557.8 m, which gives it 16,755 dam of flood control storage. The reservoir, though, is not intended for flood control as its value is in the water it supplies to the power station.

A three year project, that ran from 2017 to 2020, changed the city of Estevan's water supply from Boundary Reservoir to McDonald Lake.

Woodlawn Regional Park 

Woodlawn Regional Park is on the north-east shore of the reservoir. The park is actually divided into two sections. The original section, which is along the Souris River just south of Estevan, was founded in 1962. It features full-service camping, TS & M 18-hole golfing, Kayaking and Canoeing, live outdoor theatre, hiking, ball diamonds, and many more outdoor activities. In 2011, an historic flood nearly destroyed the park as silt was piled up 8 feet in areas and parts of the river had widened by up to 50 feet. 

In 2009, Woodlawn acquired the Boundary Dam portion of the park. This area features full-service camping, a beach area, a boat launch, professional beach volleyball courts, and the annual Beach Bash held each year in August. Boundary Dam Reservoir is the only lake in Saskatchewan that has a large area that does not freeze over in the winter due to warm water being returned to the lake from the Boundary Dam Power Station. This means that this is the only lake in Saskatchewan that supports largemouth bass.

See also
List of lakes of Saskatchewan
List of protected areas of Saskatchewan
Dams and reservoirs in Saskatchewan

References

External links

Estevan No. 5, Saskatchewan
Division No. 1, Saskatchewan
Lakes of Saskatchewan
Dams in Saskatchewan
Dams completed in 1957